The 2021 Indonesia Masters (officially known as the Daihatsu Indonesia Masters 2021 for sponsorship reasons) was a badminton tournament that took place at the Bali International Convention Center in Nusa Dua, Badung Regency, Bali, Indonesia, from 16 to 21 November 2021 and had a total prize of US$600,000.

In 2021, the tournament got upgraded from a Super 500 to a Super 750.

Tournament
The 2021 Indonesia Masters was the 8th tournament according to the 2021 BWF World Tour as many tournaments got canceled due to the COVID-19 pandemic. It was a part of the Indonesia Masters, which had been held since 2010. The tournament was organized by the Badminton Association of Indonesia with sanction from BWF. It was also part of the Indonesia Badminton Festival in which three tournaments; the Indonesia Open and World Tour Finals, together with this tournament were held at the same venue, played back-to-back.

Venue
This international tournament was held at Bali International Convention Center in Nusa Dua, Badung Regency, Bali, Indonesia.

Point distribution 
Below is the point distribution table for each phase of the tournament based on the BWF points system for the BWF World Tour Super 750 event.

Prize money 
The total prize money for this tournament was US$600,000. The distribution of the prize money was in accordance with BWF regulations.

Men's singles

Seeds 

 Kento Momota (champion)
 Viktor Axelsen (second round)
 Anders Antonsen (final)
 Chou Tien-chen (semi-finals)
 Anthony Sinisuka Ginting (first round)
 Jonatan Christie (second round)
 Lee Zii Jia (first round)
 Ng Ka Long (quarter-finals)

Finals

Top half

Section 1

Section 2

Bottom half

Section 3

Section 4

Women's singles

Seeds 

 Akane Yamaguchi (final)
 Ratchanok Intanon (second round)
 P. V. Sindhu (semi-finals)
 An Se-young (champion)
 Pornpawee Chochuwong (quarter-finals)
 Michelle Li (first round)
 Busanan Ongbamrungphan (first round)
 Sayaka Takahashi (quarter-finals)

Finals

Top half

Section 1

Section 2

Bottom half

Section 3

Section 4

Men's doubles

Seeds 

 Marcus Fernaldi Gideon / Kevin Sanjaya Sukamuljo (final)
 Mohammad Ahsan / Hendra Setiawan (second round)
 Lee Yang / Wang Chi-lin (quarter-finals)
 Fajar Alfian / Muhammad Rian Ardianto (first round)
 Aaron Chia / Soh Wooi Yik (semi-finals)
 Chirag Shetty / Satwiksairaj Rankireddy (first round)
 Kim Astrup / Anders Skaarup Rasmussen (quarter-finals)
 Vladimir Ivanov / Ivan Sozonov (first round)

Finals

Top half

Section 1

Section 2

Bottom half

Section 3

Section 4

Women's doubles

Seeds 

 Kim So-yeong / Kong Hee-yong (semi-finals)
 Greysia Polii / Apriyani Rahayu (quarter-finals)
 Jongkolphan Kititharakul / Rawinda Prajongjai (quarter-finals)
 Nami Matsuyama / Chiharu Shida (champions)
 Gabriela Stoeva / Stefani Stoeva (second round)
 Chloe Birch / Lauren Smith (second round)
 Mayu Matsumoto / Ayako Sakuramoto (second round)
 Pearly Tan / Thinaah Muralitharan (quarter-finals)

Finals

Top half

Section 1

Section 2

Bottom half

Section 3

Section 4

Mixed doubles

Seeds 

 Dechapol Puavaranukroh / Sapsiree Taerattanachai (champions)
 Praveen Jordan / Melati Daeva Oktavianti (first round)
 Yuta Watanabe / Arisa Higashino (semi-finals)
 Marcus Ellis / Lauren Smith (quarter-finals)
 Chan Peng Soon / Goh Liu Ying (first round)
 Hafiz Faizal / Gloria Emanuelle Widjaja (quarter-finals)
 Tang Chun Man / Tse Ying Suet (final)
 Thom Gicquel / Delphine Delrue (first round)

Finals

Top half

Section 1

Section 2

Bottom half

Section 3

Section 4

References

External links
 Tournament Link
 Official Website

Indonesian Masters (badminton)
Indonesia Masters
Indonesia Masters (badminton)
Indonesia Masters